John Burnett may refer to:

Law
 John Burnett (advocate) (c. 1764–1810), Scottish advocate and judge
 John Burnett (judge) (1831–1890), American judge on the Oregon Supreme Court

Politics
 John Burnett (colonial secretary) (1781–1860), colonial secretary of Van Diemens Land
 John Burnett (trade unionist) (1842–1914), British trade unionist and civil servant
 John George Burnett (1876–1962), British politician, Member of Parliament
 John Burnett, Baron Burnett (born 1945), British politician, Member of Parliament
 John L. Burnett (1854–1919), U.S. Representative from Alabama

Sports
 John Burnett (cricketer) (1840–1878), English cricketer
 Johnny Burnett (baseball) (1904–1957), American baseball player
 John Burnett (footballer) (born 1939), English association (soccer) footballer
 John Burnett (rugby league) (1935–2022), English rugby league footballer who played in the 1950s and 1960s

Other
 John Burnett (merchant) (1729–1784), Aberdeen merchant
 John Napier Burnett (1899–1989), Canadian educator
 John Harrison Burnett (1922–2007), British botanist and mycologist
 John Burnett (historian) (1925–2006), English social historian
 John Burnett (priest) (fl. 1955–1969), Australian Anglican priest
 John F. Burnett, American film editor

See also
John Burnet (disambiguation)
Johnny Burnette (1934–1964), musician